Sarkaneh Abbasabad (also Romanized as Sarkāneh  ‘Abbāsābād; also known as Sarkāneh) is a village in Gerit Rural District, Papi District, Khorramabad County, Lorestan Province, Iran. At the 2006 census, its population was 50, in 10 families.

References 

Towns and villages in Khorramabad County